Little Boy was the codename of the atomic bomb dropped on Hiroshima.

Little Boy may also refer to:
 Little Boy: The Arts of Japan's Exploding Subculture, a 2005 book about Japanese postwar culture
 Little Boy (film), a 2015 American film
 Little Boy (album), an album by Janno Gibbs
 "Little Boy" (Captain Jack song)
 "Little Boy" (The Crystals song)
 "Little Boy", a song by KSI (2017)
 "Little Boy", a song by Miriam Makeba from The World of Miriam Makeba
 "Little Boy", a song by Vance Joy from Nation of Two
 "Little Boys", a 2007 episode of the television series How I Met Your Mother

See also
 Little Boy Blue (disambiguation)
 Little Boy Lost (disambiguation)